Clemente Iriarte Madariaga (25 July 1946 – 29 December 2021) was a Spanish professional footballer who played as a midfielder.

Career
Iriarte played for Rayo Vallecano, Burgos, Real Oviedo and Osasuna.

Personal life and death
Iriarte was born in Pamplona on 25 July 1946. He died in Pamplona on 29 December 2021, at the age of 75.

References

1946 births
2021 deaths
Spanish footballers
Footballers from Pamplona
Association football midfielders
La Liga players
Segunda División players
Rayo Vallecano players
Burgos CF (1936) footballers
Real Oviedo players
CA Osasuna players